The 43rd FIL Junior European Luge Championships took place under the auspices of the International Luge Federation in Bludenz, Austria from 15 to 16 January 2022.

Medalists

Medal table

References

FIL Junior European Luge Championships
Junior European Luge Championships
Junior European Luge Championships
Luge
Luge in Austria
International sports competitions hosted by Austria
Sport in Vorarlberg
Junior European Luge Championships